The Pit is a monument dedicated to the victims of the Holocaust on the corner of Melnikayte and Zaslavskaya streets in Minsk, Belarus. The memorial is located at the site where on 2 March 1942 Nazi forces shot about 5,000 Jewish residents of the nearby Minsk Ghetto.

The obelisk was created in 1947, and in 2000 a bronze sculpture titled "The Last Way" was added. It represents a group of victims descending the steps of the pit. The sculpture was created by the Belarusian artist and Chairman of the Jewish communities of Belarus, Leonid Levin, and the sculptor Elsa Pollak from Israel. On the obelisk is written in Russian and Yiddish, "To the shining memory of the bright days of five thousand Jews who perished at the hands of sworn enemies of humanity, German-fascist butchers, on 2 March 1942."

When the reconstruction of the memorial was undertaken, no machinery was used and all the work was done by hand, a process which took eight years to complete. According to the original plan, the memorial supposed to be more detailed, but it was ultimately left with an expressive aestheticism and devoid of national colours. It includes figures of a violinist, children, and a pregnant woman, allowing for representation of collective character. The memorial has been a target of vandalism. Funeral assemblies are held at the memorial every year on 2 March.

See also
 The Holocaust in Belarus
 List of Holocaust memorials and museums

References

Jews and Judaism in Minsk
Holocaust memorials
The Holocaust in Belarus
2000 sculptures
Bronze sculptures in Belarus